Jakub Jamróg (born 24 June 1991) is  Polish speedway rider.

Craeer
Born in Tarnów, he began his career with local team Unia Tarnów who he rode for between 2009 and 2012, before signing for Orzeł Łódź in 2013.

In 2015, he won the Argentine Championship and later signed to ride for Coventry Bees in the Elite League, although he was dropped before the season started after disappointing performances in pre-season meetings.

He also rode for Masarna in Swedish Elitserien and Autoklub v AČR Slaný in the Czech league.

References

1991 births
Living people
Polish speedway riders
Sportspeople from Tarnów
Coventry Bees riders